Jacek Graniecki, known professionally as Tede and DJ Buhh  is a Polish rapper. Also known as Tas De Fleia, TDF, Tedzik, Tedunio, Chory Pastor. He began his career in the band 1 kHz (Ein Killa Hertz). In 1996 JanMario and Tede created a band named Trzyha (Triple H, which stands for Hardcore Hip-Hop), with the group changing their name to Warszafski Deszcz (Warsaw's Rain) in 1998. In 2000 Tede began his solo career and in 2001 he recorded his first album (S.P.O.R.T).
 	
In 2002 he founded his own record label - Wielkie Joł. He was ranked third in a music magazine Machina toplist of thirty best Polish rappers in 2011.

Discography 
 Studio albums
 2001: S.P.O.R.T. POL #28
 2003: Hajs, Hajs, Hajs (Cash, Cash, Cash) POL #8
 2004: Notes (Note-book) POL #7
 2006: Esende Mylffon POL #15
 2008: Ścieżka dźwiękowa (Soundtrack) POL #8
 2009: Note2 POL #3 (certified gold)
 2010: FuckTede/Glam Rap POL #2 (certified gold)
 2010: Notes 3D POL #23
 2012: Mefistotedes/Odkupienie (Mefistotedes/Redemption) POL #3 (certified gold)
 2013: Elliminati POL #2 (certified gold)
 2014: #kurt_rolson POL #3 (certified gold)
 2015: Vanillahajs (VanillaCash) POL #1 (certified 2× platinum)
 2016: Keptn''' (Captain) POL #1 (certified gold)
 2017: SKRRRT POL #1 (certified gold)
 2018: NOJI? POL #2 
2019: Karmagedon POL #1
2020: Disco Noir POL #1

 Live albums
 2017: Pół życia na żywo Trzyha
 1997: WuWuA Warszafski Deszcz
 1999: Nastukafszy... 2007: Reminiscencje 2009: Powrócifszy... 2011: PraWFDepowiedziafszy Collaborative albums
 2013: Przypadek? #niesondze (Coincidence? #idontthinkso with Potwierdzone Info)

 Extended plays
 2009: Note2 Errata (Note2 Erratum)
 2012: Spacer (Walk, with Szyna)
 2013: Elliminaticket 2014: #kurort_rolson 2017: Letnie czartery (Summer Charters)
 2020: Disco Noir: Przedłużyfszy (Disco Noir: Extended)
	
 Mixtapes
 2003: DJ Buhh - Wolumin I: Hałas (Volume I: Noise)
 2003: DJ Buhh - Wolumin II: George W. Buhh (Volume II: George W. Buhh)
 2004: DJ Buhh - Wolumin III: Buhhmacher (Volume III: Buhhmaker)
 2006: DJ Buhh - Esende Mylffon Hałas (Esende Mylffon Noise)
 2006: Tede & DJ Macu - Wypijmy za blendy Vol. 1 (Let's Drink for Blends Vol. 1)
 2006: Tede & DJ Buhh - Trzy korony (Three Crowns)
 2007: Tede & DJ Macu - Wypijmy za blendy Vol. 2: Wypijmy za błędy (Let's Drink for Blends Vol. 2: Let's Drink for Mistakes)
 2007: DJ Buhh Presents Tede, Jay-Z, Matheo - American Mylffon 2008: DJ Buhh - Wolumin IV: Pierdolę was (Volume IV: Fuck You)
 2009: Tede & DJ Tuniziano - A/H24N2 2010: DJ Buhh - Wolumin V: Facebuhh 2011: DJ Buhh - South Tropez (with Dabl Blast)
 2012: Tede, DJ Tuniziano & DJ Buhh - Droga do odkupienia (Way to Redemption)
 2012: Tede & DJ Tuniziano - Numer stulecia 2013: Paff Bangerski & Tede - PAFFISTOTEDES
 2014: młodyGrzech & Tede - Ultradźwięki (Ultrasound)
 2015: DJ Buhh - Wolumin VII - Hans Ximer: Uwertura'' (Volume VII - Hans Ximer: Overture)

References

External links 

 Tede discography at Discogs
 Wielkie Joł, a record label founded by Tede

1976 births
Living people
Rappers from Warsaw
Polish rappers
Polish musicians
Polish atheists